Caolan McAleer (born 19 August 1993) is a Northern Irish professional footballer who plays for Loughgall as a winger.

Early and personal life
McAleer comes from Strabane, and attended Christian Brothers Grammar School, Omagh.

Club career
McAleer moved from Linfield to Scottish club Partick Thistle in January 2012. After making his debut for them in May 2012, McAleer signed a new two-year contract in July 2012, before going on loan to Arthurlie. Later that month, McAleer participated in the 2012 Milk Cup. On 2 October 2013, Partick Thistle announced that McAleer would join Scottish League Two side Albion Rovers on loan until 6 January 2014. However, the loan deal broke down two days later, and he moved on loan to Airdrieonians on 21 November 2013.

On 5 June 2014, McAleer signed for East Fife. After one season with The Fifers, McAleer returned to Airdrieonians, signing a contract with the club in June 2015. In January 2016, McAleer moved on loan to Kilbirnie Ladeside until the end of the season.

In July 2016, McAleer signed for Greenock Morton. McAleer was released in mid-December 2016. From here he moved to the Republic of Ireland to join Finn Harps in January 2017. He spent the 2018 season with Sligo Rovers.

After one season, McAleer returned to Finn Harps for the 2019 season. On 13 December 2019 it was confirmed that McAleer would join Dungannon Swifts on 1 January 2020 on a deal until the summer 2021. He moved to Loughgall in January 2022.

International career
McAleer played for Northern Ireland at Schools Under-18 level in the Centenary Shield.

Career statistics

References

1993 births
Living people
Association footballers from Northern Ireland
Expatriate association footballers from Northern Ireland
Expatriate footballers in Scotland
Linfield F.C. players
Partick Thistle F.C. players
Arthurlie F.C. players
Airdrieonians F.C. players
East Fife F.C. players
Scottish Football League players
Scottish Professional Football League players
Association football wingers
Kilbirnie Ladeside F.C. players
Greenock Morton F.C. players
Northern Ireland youth international footballers
Scottish Junior Football Association players
Expatriate association footballers in the Republic of Ireland
Finn Harps F.C. players
Sligo Rovers F.C. players
Dungannon Swifts F.C. players
League of Ireland players
Loughgall F.C. players